Ernest Richardson may refer to:

 Ernest Cushing Richardson (1860-1939), American librarian and theologian
 Ernest Frank Richardson (1871-1952), British constable 
 Ernie Richardson (curler)  (born 1931), Canadian curler
 Ernie Richardson (footballer) (Ernest William Richardson, 1916–1977), British footballer
 E. L. Richardson (sports executive) (Ernest Lamont Richardson), Canadian businessman and sports executive